Single Drunk Female is an American comedy television series created by Simone Finch that premiered on Freeform on January 20, 2022. In April 2022, the series was renewed for a second season, which is set to premiere on Freeform on April 12, 2023, with all second season episodes set to be released on Hulu on April 13.

Plot
After a terribly embarrassing public meltdown, alcoholic Samantha Fink has only one chance to avoid jail time. She needs to stay sober and move back in with her bossy mother, Carol. Back in the Boston area, Samantha tries to make the best of the situation. However, that's easier said than done. Samantha is confronted with the ghosts of her past, which drove her to alcohol addiction. And then there's her mother, who was conspicuous by her absence when Samantha was young, and now meddles in everything and showers her with sage advice. At first Samantha is reluctant to take a new path, but when her childhood best friend Brit reveals surprising news, Samantha has to admit that her partying life can't go on like this.

Cast and characters

Main

 Sofia Black-D'Elia as Samantha Fink, a 28-year-old alcoholic who is forced to move back home after hitting rock bottom
 Rebecca Henderson as Olivia, sponsor of Samantha at Alcoholics Anonymous
 Sasha Compère as Brit, Samantha's ex-BFF
 Lily Mae Harrington as Felicia, Samantha's drinking buddy and current BFF
 Garrick Bernard as James, a fellow member of Alcoholics Anonymous
 Ally Sheedy as Carol, Samantha's mother

Recurring
 Jon Glaser as Nathaniel, Samantha's former boss
 Madison Shepard as Gail Williams, Samantha's probation officer
 Jojo Brown as Melinda "Mindy" Moy, Samantha's boss at Giovanni's grocery store 
 Ian Gomez as Bob, Carol's boyfriend
 Charlie Hall as Joel, Samantha's ex-boyfriend and Brit's fiancé
 Madeline Wise as Stephanie, Olivia's wife
 Tom Simmons as Ronnie

Production

Development
On September 25, 2019, Freeform gave Single Drunk Female a pilot order. On February 26, 2021, Freeform gave production a series order consisting of ten episodes. The series is created by Simone Finch, who also executive produces alongside Leslye Headland, Jenni Konner, and Phil Traill. Headland also directed the pilot while Finch wrote the pilot. 20th Television is involved with producing the series. On April 26, 2022, Freeform renewed the series for a second season.

Casting
Upon the pilot order announcement, Sofia Black-D'Elia and Ally Sheedy were cast to star. Upon the series order announcement, Rebecca Henderson, Sasha Compère, Lily Mae Harrington and Garrick Bernard joined the main cast. On January 7, 2022, Jojo Brown, Charlie Hall, Madison Shepard, Ian Gomez, Madeline Wise, and Jon Glaser were cast in recurring roles. In January 2023, it was announced that Busy Philipps and Ricky Velez had been added to the cast in recurring roles in the second season, with Charlie Hall set to return as Sam’s ex-boyfriend Joel.

Episodes

Series overview

Season 1 (2022)

Season 2

Broadcast and release
The series premiered on Freeform on January 20, 2022. The second season is scheduled to premiere on April 12, 2023, with all ten second season episodes set to be released on Hulu on April 13.

Reception

Critical response
For the first season, the review aggregator website Rotten Tomatoes reported a 96% approval rating with an average rating of 7.8/10, based on 25 critic reviews. The website's critics consensus reads, "Single Drunk Females clear-eyed chronicle of the challenges of sobriety is a joy, thanks in part to some spiky satire and Sofia Black-D'Elia's spirited star turn." Metacritic, which uses a weighted average, assigned a score of 76 out of 100 based on 11 critics, indicating "generally favorable reviews."

Leila Latif of The A.V. Club gave the first season a B and said, "Sofia Black-D'Elia makes for an incredible lead across all 10 episodes, selling every moment of Samantha's story as a woman with high-functioning alcoholism rebuilding her life." Reviewing the series' first season for The Guardian, Ellen E Jones gave a rating of 4 out of 5 stars and described it as "a show that has most to say at the very point when other shows lose interest."

Ratings

Accolades
In 2021, the series won the IMDbPro Top 200 Scripted TV Recipients for ReFrame Stamp.

References

External links

2020s American comedy television series
2020s American LGBT-related comedy television series
2022 American television series debuts
Alcohol abuse in television
English-language television shows
Female bisexuality in fiction
Freeform (TV channel) original programming
Lesbian-related television shows
Television series by 20th Century Fox Television
Television shows about Jews and Judaism
Television shows set in Massachusetts